Captain John Alfred Hewitt (6 January 1925 – 6 January 2011) was a British modern pentathlete. He competed at the 1952 Summer Olympics.

Hewitt was the son of Alfred James Hewitt, who was then serving in the Royal Navy. Becoming an officer in the Royal Marines, in 1956 Hewitt married Shirley Stamp, daughter of a London dental surgeon living in Devon.  Their daughter Alexandra was born in 1957. Their son is James Hewitt, former Major in the Life Guards and media personality, known for his relationship with Diana, Princess of Wales. In 1974, Hewitt was organizing pony-trekking holidays in Devon.

References

External links
 

1925 births
2011 deaths
British male modern pentathletes
Olympic modern pentathletes of Great Britain
Modern pentathletes at the 1952 Summer Olympics
Royal Marines officers
20th-century Royal Marines personnel